Filler is a surname. Notable people with the surname include:

 Deb Filler (born 1954), New Zealand born writer/performer, character artist and producer
 Graham Filler, American politician
 Louis Filler (1911–1998), American teacher and scholar 
 Martin Filler (born 1948), American architecture critic
 Ross Filler (born 1972), known as Remedy, American rapper